Ezhgu (also Romanized as Ezhgū; also known as ezhgoo and Ezhgu) is a summer-village in Chashm Rural District, Shahmirzad District, Mehdishahr County, Semnan Province, Iran at 2600m altitude. At the 2016 census, its population was 20, in 4 families.

References 

Populated places in Mehdishahr County